This article covers the 2006 season of the Collingwood Football Club AFL team.

News 
Pre-Season
 Shane Woewodin is delisted by Collingwood. He was not picked up by a club in the Pre-Season draft.
 Collingwood attends a high-altitude training camp in Arizona, United States for two weeks.
 Dale Thomas is picked up by Collingwood at No. 2 in the 2005 NAB Draft.
February
 President Eddie McGuire has been appointed CEO of the Nine Network. He had to give up as host on several TV shows, but remained as president of the club, despite having to live in Sydney.
 Sean Rusling injures his shoulder on the Community Camp in Northern Sydney. He is expected to miss around 2 months of action.
 Collingwood wins first game of the NAB Cup against St Kilda in fine style, winning in extra time. Fraser Gehrig missed a shot on goal after the siren to draw the match, therefore, as a knockout competition winner was decided in extra time.
March
 Captain Nathan Buckley plays his first game of the year during a NAB Challenge match played at Princes Park.
 Rookie Harry O'Brien is promoted to the senior list for the injured Sean Rusling
 Six players were inducted into the club's Hall of Fame. They were Charlie Pannam, Darren Millane, Harold Rumney, Des Healy, Billy Picken and Mick McGuane.
April
 No. 2 draft pick Dale Thomas makes his debut against  at Telstra Dome. Collingwood lose by 34 points.
 Collingwood win their first game of the year in Round 2 against .
 Dale Thomas receives the Round 2 AFL Rising Star nomination.
 Collingwood defeat  in the annual Anzac Day clash, in front of more than 92,000 fans in the return to the Melbourne Cricket Ground.
 Ben Johnson wins the Anzac Day Medal for best on ground.
 Chad Morrison was fined $20,000 by the club for drink driving, where the club's sponsorship with the TAC came under fire.
May
 Heath Shaw receives the Round 5 AFL Rising Star nomination.
 The club is fined a massive $200,000 by the TAC after the Morrison incident
 Collingwood beat  by 102 points in Round 8 at the MCG.
 Rhyce Shaw makes his comeback to the side after his season ending knee injury in 2005.
June
 Scott Pendlebury makes his debut against the Brisbane Lions at the MCG.
 Blake Caracella suffers a career-ending neck injury, sustained in a clash with Brisbane Lions player Tim Notting. Experts said he was lucky not to become a quadriplegic.
 Collingwood beat reigning premiers Sydney at Telstra Stadium. It would be the first of a current 10-match winning streak against them.
July
 Dual best and fairest Paul Licuria is 'rested' for the match against West Coast. Collingwood wins convincingly, avenging defeat in Round 7.
 Goal-sneak Leon Davis fractures his left ankle.
 Chris Tarrant and Ben Johnson involved in brawl outside a Port Melbourne hotel, leaving one man in injured.
August
 Chris Tarrant and Ben Johnson are fined $5000 by the club for breaking team rules.
 Blake Caracella announces his retirement, coming after his neck injury sustained in Round 10.
 Sam Iles makes his debut against  at AAMI Stadium
 Collingwood loses against bottom-placed  in Round 19 – thus giving them the ignominy of being the only Victorian team to lose to the Bombers during the 2006 season. This loss would cost Collingwood a top four position at the end of the season. Collingwood had already won the earlier ANZAC Day match.
 A bronze statue in the honour of Bob Rose is revealed outside the Lexus Centre.
 Forward Alan Didak receives excess media attention, after he was kicked out of a club for a dispute with his girlfriend.
 Alan Didak kicks the winning goal with seconds remaining against  at AAMI Stadium.
 Alan Didak makes a controversial bump on former teammate Heath Scotland. The tribunal throws the case out.
 Chad Morrison retires.
September
 Heath Shaw finishes third in the AFL Rising Star.
 Collingwood finish 7th, after being defeated by the Western Bulldogs in the first elimination final.
 Brodie Holland is suspended for 6 weeks after a hit on Brett Montgomery in the elimination final. Holland's appeal fails.
 Alan Didak wins his first All-Australian selection.
October
 Alan Didak wins the Copeland Trophy from James Clement and Ben Johnson, coming sooner than 24 hours after he was involved in an incident with a taxi driver.
 Collingwood trades Chris Tarrant to Fremantle in exchange for Paul Medhurst and a first-round draft pick.
 Collingwood delist Cameron Cloke, Jason Cloke, David Fanning, Brent Hall, Adam Iacobucci and Julian Rowe.
November
 The club re-visits Arizona for another pre-season high-altitude camp.
 Tristen Walker is delisted by the club, the seventh player chopped.

Playing List 2006 
Nathan Buckley will be the 2006 captain, this being his seventh season as the skipper of the Pies. Collingwood had delisted several players last season, including Brownlow Medallist Shane Woewodin, and traded Richard Cole to Essendon. They had picked up several young players, including priority/first round draftees Dale Thomas and Scott Pendlebury in the 2005 NAB Draft. With the high number of senior players departed in 2005, both Ben Davies and David Fanning got elevated to the Senior List.

Squad

Senior list

Rookie List

Arrivals 
 Rookie elevation
 Ben Davies
 David Fanning

 2005 NAB Draft
 Jack Anthony
 Ryan Cook
 Scott Pendlebury
 Danny Stanley
 Dale Thomas

 NAB AFL Pre-Season Draft
 Sam Iles

Departures 
 Traded
 Richard Cole (to Essendon)

 Delisted
 Tom Davidson
 David King
 Matthew Lokan
 Billy Morrison
 Brayden Shaw
 Andrew Williams
 Shane Woewodin

2006 Fixtures 
With the 2006 Commonwealth Games being hosted by Melbourne, Australia, The M.C.G. will be the main venue, dis-allowing games for AFL Football. Collingwood plays its first three games at the Telstra Dome, before being playing the traditional Anzac Day clash against Essendon in what will be the return to the MCG, as the Games will have been concluded. This is fixtured, however, the venue may not be ready for hosting an AFL match in time.

Collingwood travels 4 times, twice to Adelaide, in a 3-week period late in the season. They also travel to Perth and Sydney during the season.

Pre-Season

NAB Cup

NAB Challenge

Home and Away

Finals 

2006
2006 in Australian rules football
2006 Australian Football League season